Rushan Minnegulov is a Russian biathlete and cross-country skier. He won the gold medal in the men's 20km standing cross-country skiing event at the 2014 Winter Paralympics held in Sochi, Russia. He also won the silver medal in the men's 1km sprint classic event and the gold medal in the 4 x 2.5 kilometre open relay event. He also competed in biathlon and cross-country skiing at the 2010 Winter Paralympics held in Vancouver, Canada.

In 2013, he won the gold medal in the open team relay event at the IPC Biathlon and Cross-Country Skiing World Championships held in Sollefteå, Sweden.

He won the silver medal in the men's long-distance standing cross-country skiing event at the 2021 World Para Snow Sports Championships held in Lillehammer, Norway. He also won the silver medal in the men's sprint standing cross-country skiing event.

References

External links
 

Living people
Year of birth missing (living people)
Place of birth missing (living people)
Russian male biathletes
Russian male cross-country skiers
Paralympic cross-country skiers of Russia
Biathletes at the 2010 Winter Paralympics
Cross-country skiers at the 2010 Winter Paralympics
Cross-country skiers at the 2014 Winter Paralympics
Medalists at the 2014 Winter Paralympics
Paralympic medalists in cross-country skiing
Paralympic gold medalists for Russia
Paralympic silver medalists for Russia
Russian disabled sportspeople
21st-century Russian people